Tie stalls, also known as stanchion or stall barn, are a type of stall where animals are tethered at the neck to their stall. It is mostly used in the dairy industry, although horses might also be stalled in tie stalls (often referred to as stands or straight stalls). Typical the barn has two rows of stalls, where the cow is tied up for resting, feeding, milking and watering. This type of housing is used in both regular and organic farming.

History 
Deep litter barns were commonly used on mainland Europe until the late 19th century. The mixture of bedding material (usually straw) and manure proved to be perfect fertilizer. However, the introduction of artificial fertilizer meant farmers no longer needed to use animal manure as fertilizer. In addition, around 1870, people started to increasingly realize hygiene within the dairy industry was important. Cows in deep litter barns were often dirty, which meant they also had dirty udders, resulting in contamination of the milk. Standing in manure all day also resulted in lameness and other hoof problems. Hence, farmers started to build the more hygienic tie stalls. After World War II farmers started to replace tie stalls with the free stall barn.

Types 
Two types of tie stalls can be distinguished.

 Dutch barn: The two rows of stalls are located in such a way that the animals face each other. In between the stall rows is the feeding alley (and sometimes a walkway). Behind the animals runs the manure gutter. A small walkway is located between the manure gutter and the wall. 
 Fresian barn: The two rows of stalls are located in such a way that the animals face the wall. The feeding alley is located between the animals and the wall. The manure gutter and walkway are located behind the animals, between the stall rows.

The barn 
Modern tie stall are quite different from the tie stalls in the 20th century. Most of the barn used to have low ceilings stagnating the airflow. This is especially troublesome in the summer, when cows are likely to suffer from heat stress. Nowadays, ventilators are used in tie stalls with low ceilings. In the US, tunnel ventilation might be applied, in which one wall contains (lots of) exhaust fans and there is an open wall on the opposite end. A sprinkler system, often used as prevention of heat stress in free stalls, isn't used in tie stall as the bedding might get too moist.

As cows spend most of their day ruminating, it is important they have enough space to stand up and lie down. Older barns didn't have a divider between the stalls, which meant a cow could put her legs in the neighboring stall preventing the neighboring cow from lying down. Nowadays, the usage of stall dividers is common placed and in some countries even mandatory.

The stall dimensions depend on the on cow size, with pregnant and sick cows needing even more space. In the Netherland dimensions of 1,85 meter by 1,25 meter are used. In the USA 52inch (1,3208meter) is most common. The front of the stall should be open so that the cow can lunge forward when standing up.

Different materials can be used for the bedding. In the 20th century, the bedding consisted of concreted, now waterbeds and matrasses are more common. However, as these surfaces are not comfortable enough on their own, usually a layer of sand, sawdust or straw is added.

Chain length is of crucial importance. When too long, a chain might allow the cow to lie too far backwards in the manure gutter. In addition, the cow might get her legs stuck in the chain. A chain that is too short prevents the cow from lying down / standing up.

Usage across the world

North-America 
in 2014, 39% of the dairy farms used tie stalls for lactating cow. Furthermore, 73% of the Canadian dairy farms used a tie stall in 2021.

Netherlands 
Until 1970, when the free stalls with cubicle were introduced, the almost all farms used tie stalls (called 'grupstal'). It was common practice to keep the cows indoor from autumn to spring, while they were out grazing during the summer. In 2017 Stichting Kwaliteitszorg Onderhoud Melkinstallaties (KOM) indicated that approximately 6.5% of the farms still used tie stalls. The usage of tie stalls hasn't been allowed for organic farming since 2016. However, dairy processors no longer accept new suppliers using tie stalls.

Germany 
According an estimation in 2010, approximately 27% of the cows are kept in tie stalls especially on smaller farms (< 20 cows). Differences between areas are large. In 2017, 30% of the dairy farms in Baden-Württemberg used tie stalls, while 60% of the farm in Bavaria did so. Note, it is quite common to keep the cows inside all year round.

Alps (Austria and Switzerland) 
In the alpine area it is very common to keep  animals indoor in tie stalls from autumn to spring and move them to mountain pastures in the summer. However, in Switzerland it is required to give the cows outdoor exercise for at least 4 hours a day.

Norway 
88% of the cows were estimated to be kept in a tie stall in 2005. However, in 2004 a new law was introduced prohibiting cows to be kept in tie stalls from 2034 onwards if the stall was built before 22 April 2004.

Animal welfare 
The restriction of movement is a general animal welfare concern. Hence, animal welfare organizations are general against the usage of tie stalls. In addition to the restriction of movement, the inability to socialize with other cows is a concern.

Tie stall advocates argue, however, that tie stalls limit competition for feeding and drinking. It is also impossible to have an overcrowded barn, which occurs in free stall barns when there are more cows than resting places.

References

Livestock